Lefortovo District is a district of South-Eastern Administrative Okrug of the federal city of Moscow, Russia. Population:

History
The Lefortovo District commemorates the name of a close associate of Tsar Peter the Great, Franz Lefort (1656-1699), whose troops were stationed nearby at the German Quarter. Lefortovo is considered to have been founded in 1699. In the 18th century it was home to Annenhof, Sloboda Palace, and the  Catherine Palace. In later centuries, the district hosted troops and military organizations, and also became heavily industrialized.

The present-day Lefortovo has a reputation for the Lefortovo Prison, Lefortovo Park and the Lefortovo Tunnel on the Third Ring. Several higher-educational institutions are located in Lefortovo, such as the Moscow Power Engineering Institute.

See also
German Quarter
Vvedenskoye Cemetery

References

Districts of Moscow
South-Eastern Administrative Okrug